May Isang Pangarap (International title: There's A Dream / ) is a 2013 Philippine drama television series directed by Jerry Lopez Sineneng, Erick C. Salud, Manny Q. Palo and Claudio "Tots" Sanchez-Mariscal IV. The series stars Vina Morales and Carmina Villarroel, together with leading female child stars Larah Claire Sabroso and Julia Klarisse Base. The series premiered on ABS-CBN's Kapamilya Gold afternoon block replacing MMK Klasiks and was replaced by My Little Juan. from January 21, 2013 to May 17, 2013, and worldwide on TFC on January 22, 2013.

The series was streaming online on YouTube.

This series is currently airing on Kapamilya Online Live every Monday-Friday, 6:30 am & 7:15 am and was replacing Magkaribal.

Cast and characters

Main cast 
 Larah Claire Sabroso as Lara Mariella Francisco Santos
 Julia Klarisse Base as Julia Rodriguez
 Vina Morales as Karina "Kare" Rodriguez
 Carmina Villarroel as Vanessa "Nessa" Francisco

Supporting cast 
 Rico Blanco as Joseph "Otep" Santos
 Gloria Diaz as Olivia Rodriguez
 Bembol Roco as Turing
 Dennis Padilla as Restituto "Resty" Francisco
 Shamaine Centenera-Buencamino as Azon Francisco
 Ron Morales as Enrico "Eric" Castro
 Valerie Concepcion as Lorraine Castro
 Dominic Roque as Alvin Francisco
 Erin Ocampo as Danica "Nica" Rodriguez
 Ogie Diaz as Percy
 Malou Crisologo as Meldy
 Gio Alvarez as James
 Gerald Pesigan as Ipe

Guest cast 
 Dominic Ochoa as Benjie
 Eda Nolan as Belen
 Joem Bascon as Dante

Special participation
 Boy Abunda as himself

See also 
List of programs broadcast by ABS-CBN
List of ABS-CBN drama series

References

External links

ABS-CBN drama series
Television series by Dreamscape Entertainment Television
2013 Philippine television series debuts
2013 Philippine television series endings
Philippine musical television series
Filipino-language television shows
Television shows set in the Philippines